Nemerlaer Castle is a 14th-century castle, located in Haaren, Netherlands.

The castle is named after the river Nemer and after Laer which means clearing in the forest.
It was first mentioned in 1303, as home of Knight Geerlinck van den Bossche.

Currently the castle is still inhabited. In the basement is a café. In addition there are cultural and public activities, such as exhibitions and concerts. The castle is also used for weddings.

External links
official website

Historic house museums in the Netherlands
Castles in North Brabant
Museums in North Brabant
Rijksmonuments in North Brabant
Oisterwijk